Numerous castles are found in the German state of Rhineland-Palatinate. These buildings, some of which have a history of over 1000 years, were the setting of historical events and the domains of famous personalities; and many still are imposing edifices to this day.

This list encompasses buildings variously described in German as Burg (castle), Festung (fort/fortress), Schloss (manor house, palace or hunting lodge) and Palais/Palast (palace). Many German castles after the Middle Ages were built as, or converted to, royal or ducal palaces rather than fortified buildings.

Landkreis Ahrweiler 

 Are Castle, Altenahr
 Ahrenthal Palace, Sinzig
 Alkburg, Brohl-Lützing
 Brohleck Manor, Brohl-Lützing
 Burgbrohl Manor, Burgbrohl
 Landskron Castle, Bad Neuenahr
 Marienfels Castle, Remagen
 Neuenahr Castle, Bad Neuenahr
 Nürburg Castle, Nürburg
 Olbrück Castle, Niederzissen
 Rheineck Castle, Bad Breisig
 Saffenburg, Mayschoss
 Schweppenburg, Brohl-Lützing

Landkreis Altenkirchen (Westerwald) 
 Freusburg, Kirchen (Sieg)
 Schloss Friedewald, Friedewald (Westerwald)

Landkreis Alzey-Worms 
 Alzeyer Schloss, Alzey
 Abenheim Castle, Abenheim

Landkreis Bad Dürkheim 
 Battenberg Castle, Battenberg (Palatinate)
 Elmstein Castle, Elmstein
 Neuleiningen Castle, Neuleiningen
 Altleiningen Castle, Altleiningen
 Bischöfliches Schloss, Dirmstein
 Breitenstein Castle, Esthal
 Deidesheim Castle, Deidesheim
 Emichsburg, Bockenheim an der Weinstraße
 Erfenstein Castle, Esthal
 Hardenburg, Bad Dürkheim
 Heidenlöcher (Fliehburg), Deidesheim
 Heidenmauer, Bad Dürkheim
 Kehrdichannichts hunting lodge, Bad Dürkheim
 Koeth-Wanscheidsches Schloss, Dirmstein
 Lichtenstein Castle, Neidenfels
 Murrmirnichtviel hunting lodge, Bad Dürkheim
 Neidenfels Castle, Neidenfels
 Schloss Neuburg, Obrigheim (Palatinate)
 Nonnenfels, Isenachtal
 Quadtsches Schloss, Dirmstein
 Schaudichnichtum hunting lodge, Bad Dürkheim
 Sturmfedersches Schloss, Dirmstein
 Wachtenburg, Wachenheim an der Weinstraße
 Weilach House, Bad Dürkheim

Landkreis Bad Kreuznach 
 Altenbaumburg, Altenbamberg
 Argenschwang Castle, Argenschwang
 Dalberg Castle, Dalberg
 Schloss Dhaun, Hochstetten-Dhaun
 Ebernburg, Bad Münster am Stein-Ebernburg
 Gollenfels Castle, Stromberg
 Gutenburg, Gutenberg
 Kauzenburg, Bad Kreuznach
 Kyrburg, Kirn
 Montfort Castle, Duchroth
 Naumburg Castle, Bärenbach
 Neu-Baumburg, Neu-Bamberg
 Pfarrköpfchen Castle, Stromberg
 Rheingrafenstein Castle, Bad Münster am Stein-Ebernburg
 Schloss Rheingrafenstein, Bad Kreuznach
 Schloßböckelheim Castle, Schloßböckelheim
 Schmidtburg, Schneppenbach
 Sponheim Castle, Burgsponheim
 Stromburg, Stromberg
 Treuenfels,  Altenbamberg

Landkreis Bernkastel-Wittlich 
 Baldenau Castle, Morbach
 Schloss Bergfeld, Eisenschmitt
 Landshut Castle, Bernkastel-Kues
 Grevenburg, Traben-Trarbach
 Castles of Manderscheid (Oberburg and Niederburg), Manderscheid
 Mont Royal Fortress, Traben-Trarbach
 Schloss Veldenz, Veldenz
 Schloss Lieser, Lieser
 Hunolstein Castle, Morbach
 Starkenburg, Starkenburg (Mosel)
 Schloss Philippsfreude, Wittlich

Landkreis Birkenfeld 
 Bosselstein Castle, Idar-Oberstein
 Schloss Oberstein, Idar-Oberstein
 Schloss Birkenfeld, Birkenfeld
 Frauenburg Castle, Frauenberg

Eifelkreis Bitburg-Prüm 

 Bollendorf Castle, Bollendorf
 Dasburg, Dasburg
 Dudeldorf Castle, Dudeldorf
 Burg Falkenstein, Waldhof-Falkenstein
 Schloss Holsthum, Holsthum
 Kyllburg, Kyllburg
 Schloss Malberg, Malberg
 Neuerburg, Neuerburg
 Prümerburg, Prümzurlay
 Rittersdorf Castle, Rittersdorf
 Schönecken Castle, Schönecken
 Seinsfeld Castle, Seinsfeld
 Schloss Weilerbach, Bollendorf

Landkreis Cochem-Zell 

 Arras Castle, Alf
 Cochem Castle, Cochem
 Coraidelstein Castle, Klotten
 Metternich Castle, Beilstein
 Pyrmont Castle, Roes
 Treis Castle, Treis-Karden
 Ulmener Burgen, Ulmen
 Wildburg, Treis-Karden
 Winneburg, Cochem

Donnersbergkreis 

 Altenbolanden Castle, Bolanden
 Burg Falkenstein, Falkenstein
 Burg Frauenstein, Ruppertsecken
 Burg Hohenfels, Imsbach
 Celtic rampart on the Donnersberg, Dannenfels
 Kesselburg, Jakobsweiler
 Schloss Kirchheimbolanden, Kirchheimbolanden
 Landsberg Castle, Obermoschel
 Burg Löwenstein, Niedermoschel
 Neu-Bolanden Castle, Bolanden
 Randeck Castle, Mannweiler-Cölln
 Ruppertsecken Castle, Ruppertsecken
 Stauf Castle, Eisenberg (Palatinate)
 Tannenfels Castle, Dannenfels
 Wildenstein Castle, Dannenfels
 Biedesheim Castle, Biedesheim
 Eisenberg Castle, Eisenberg, Rhineland-Palatinate
 Gaugrehweiler Castle, Gaugrehweiler
 Gehrweiler Castle, Burg Gehrweiler
 Ilbesheim Castle, Ilbesheim
 Schloss Imsweiler (Flörsheimer Schloss), Imsweiler
 Ruhenburg, Rockenhausen
 Stolzenburg, Bayerfeld-Steckweiler
 Wartenberg Castle, Wartenberg-Rohrbach

Landkreis Germersheim 
 Jagdschloss Friedrichsbühl, Bellheim
 Germersheim Fortress, Germersheim
 Schloss Germersheim, Germersheim
 Schloss Jockgrim, Jockgrim
 Schloss Weingarten, Weingarten (Palatinate)

Landkreis Kaiserslautern 

 Alsenborn Castle, Enkenbach-Alsenborn
 Diemerstein Castle, Frankenstein
 Frankenstein Castle, Frankenstein
 Nanstein Castle, Landstuhl
 Perlenberg Castle, Bann
 Schloss Hemsbach, Neuhemsbach
 Trippstadt House, Trippstadt
 Wilenstein Castle, Trippstadt
 Dieboldsburg, Otterbach
 Schloss Fischbach, Fischbach (bei Kaiserslautern)
 Flörsheim Castle, Trippstadt
 Glasburg, Fischbach (bei Kaiserslautern)
 Schloss Neuhemsbach, Neuhemsbach
 Otterbach Castle, Otterbach
 Otterburg, Otterberg
 Schallodenbach Castle, Schallodenbach
 Schloss Schernau, Landstuhl
 Sterrenberg Castle, Otterbach
 Stolzenburg, Stelzenberg
 Schloss Weilerbach, Weilerbach

Kaiserslautern 
 Beilstein Castle
 Hohenecken Castle
 Kaiserpfalz (featured in "Legend of the Pike in the Imperial Fishpond")

Koblenz 

 Old Castle
 Feste Kaiser Alexander
 Feste Kaiser Franz
 Festung Ehrenbreitstein
 Koblenz Fortress
 Fort Asterstein
 Fort Großfürst Konstantin
 Electoral Palace
 Neuendorfer Flesche
 Schloss Philippsburg
 Schloss Stolzenfels, Koblenz
 Schloss Schönbornslust

Landkreis Kusel 
 Altenburg, Wolfstein
 Schloss Aschbacherhof, Aschbach
 Deinsberg Castle, Theisbergstegen
 Grumbach Castle, Grumbach
 Heidenburg, Oberstaufenbach
 Heidenburg, Kreimbach-Kaulbach
 Schloss Herschweiler-Pettersheim, Herschweiler-Pettersheim
 Ingweiler Castle, Reipoltskirchen
 Kübelberg Castle, Schönenberg-Kübelberg
 Schloss Lauterecken, Lauterecken
 Lichtenberg Castle, Thallichtenberg
 Liebsthal Castle, Quirnbach/Pfalz
 Medard Castle, Medard
 Michelsburg, Haschbach am Remigiusberg
 Münchweiler Castle, Glan-Münchweiler
 Naumburg, Ginsweiler
 New Wolfstein Castle, Wolfstein
 Odenbach Castle, Odenbach
 Old Wolfstein Castle, Wolfstein
 Schloss Pettersheim, Herschweiler-Pettersheim
 Schloss Quirnbach, Quirnbach/Pfalz
 Reipoltskirchen Castle, Reipoltskirchen
 Schloss Schönbornerhof, Homberg
 Sprengelburg, Eßweiler / Oberweiler im Tal
 Wadenau Castle, Thallichtenberg

Landau in der Pfalz 
 Fortanlagen
 Schloss Landau
 Schloss Arzheim
 Godramstein Castle
 Bundesfestung Landau
 Queichheim Castle

Ludwigshafen am Rhein 
 Mannheimer Rheinschanze

Mainz 
 Mainz Fortress
 Kurfürstliches Schloss Mainz
 Martinsburg
 Mainz Citadel
 Lustschloss Favorite

Landkreis Mainz-Bingen 

 Fürstenberg Castle, Oberdiebach
 Heimburg, Niederheimbach
 Kaiserpfalz, Ingelheim
 Klopp Castle, Bingen
 Landskron Castle, Oppenheim
 Mouse Tower, Bingen
 Reichenstein Castle, Trechtingshausen
 Rheinstein Castle (formerly also known as Vaitzburg or Voitsberg), Trechtingshausen
 Schwabsburg Castle, Nierstein
 Sooneck Castle, Niederheimbach
 Stadeck Castle, Stadecken-Elsheim
 Stahlberg Castle, Bacharach
 Stahleck Castle, Bacharach
 Windeck Castle, Heidesheim
 Schloss Waldthausen, Budenheim
 Trutzbingen, Münster-Sarmsheim

Landkreis Mayen-Koblenz 

 Schloss Bassenheim, Bassenheim
 Bischofstein Castle, Münstermaifeld
 Schloss Bürresheim, St. Johann
 Ehrenburg, Brodenbach
 Eltz Castle, Wierschem
 Genovevaburg, Mayen
 Goloring, Kobern-Gondorf
 Schloss Gondorf, Kobern-Gondorf
 Krayer Hof, Andernach
 Stadtburg Andernach, Andernach
 Laach Castle, Kruft
 Schloss Liebig, Kobern-Gondorf
 Löwenburg, Monreal
 Namedy Castle, Andernach
 Niederburg, Kobern-Gondorf
 Oberburg, Kobern-Gondorf
 Philippsburg, Monreal
 Sayn Castle, Bendorf
 Schloss Sayn, Bendorf
 Thurant Castle, Alken
 Trutzeltz Castle, Wierschem
 Virneburg, Virneburg
 Wernerseck Castle, Ochtendung

Neustadt an der Weinstraße 
 Hambach Castle
 Wolfsburg Castle

Landkreis Neuwied 

 Altenwied Castle, Neustadt (Wied)
 Altwied Castle, Neuwied
 Schloss Arenfels, Bad Hönningen
 Braunsberg Castle, Neuwied
 Ehrenstein Castle, Neustadt (Wied)
 Schloss Engers, Neuwied
 Hammerstein Castle, Hammerstein
 Isenburg, Isenburg
 Linz Castle, Linz (Rhein)
 Schloss Monrepos, Neuwied
 Schloss Neuwied, Neuwied
 Neuerburg, Niederbreitbach
 Reichenstein Castle, Puderbach

Pirmasens 
 Pirmasenser Schloss

Rhein-Hunsrück-Kreis 

 Old Castle, Boppard
 Balduinseck Castle, Buch
 Schloss Gemünden, Gemünden
 Kastellaun Castle, Kastellaun
 Koppenstein Castle, Gemünden
 Burg Rauschenberg, Mermuth
 Rheinfels Castle, Sankt Goar
 Schönburg, Oberwesel
 Schloss Schöneck, Boppard
 Schloss Simmern, Simmern
 Waldeck Castle, Dommershausen

Rhein-Lahn-Kreis 

 Alte Burg (Aull), Aull
 Alte Burg (Lipporn), Lipporn
 Ardeck Castle, Holzheim
 Balduinstein Castle, Balduinstein
 Grafenschloss Diez, Diez
 Gutenfels Castle, Kaub
 Heppenheft Castle, Niederwallmenach
 Herzogenstein Castle, Dörscheid
 Hohlenfels Castle, Hahnstätten
 Schloss Karlsburg, Bad Ems
 Katz Castle, Sankt Goarshausen
 Schloss Katzenelnbogen, Katzenelnbogen
 Lahneck Castle, Lahnstein
 Laurenburg Castle, Laurenburg
 Schloss Laurenburg, Laurenburg
 Schloss Liebeneck, Osterspai
 Liebenstein Castle, Kamp-Bornhofen
 Lipporner Schanze, Lipporn
 Marksburg, Braubach
 Maus Castle, St. Goarshausen
 Schloss Martinsburg, Lahnstein
 Nassau Castle, Nassau
 Schloss Oranienstein, Diez
 Wasserburg Osterspai, Osterspai
 Pfalzgrafenstein Castle, Kaub
 Schloss Philippsburg, Braubach
 Reichenberg Castle, Reichenberg
 Sauerburg, Sauerthal
 Schloss Schaumburg, Balduinstein
 Schwalbach Castle, Burgschwalbach
 Stein Palace, Nassau
 Sterrenberg Castle, Kamp-Bornhofen
 Vogtei Oberneisen, Oberneisen
 Waldecksches Jagdschloss, Geilnau

Rhein-Pfalz-Kreis 
 Gronau Castle, Rödersheim-Gronau
 Schloss Fußgönheim, Fußgönheim
 Schloss Kleinniedesheim, Kleinniedesheim
 Jagdschloss Lambsheim, Lambsheim
 Meckenheimersches Schloss, Lambsheim
 Schloss Marientraut, Hanhofen

Landkreis Südliche Weinstraße 

 Anebos Castle, Leinsweiler
 Alt-Scharfeneck Castle, Frankweiler
 Schloss Bergzabern, Bad Bergzabern
 Schloss Böchingen, Böchingen
 Schloss Edesheim, Edesheim
 Geisberg Castle, Burrweiler
 Guttenberg Castle, Oberotterbach
 Heidenschuh, Klingenmünster
 Kropsburg Castle, St. Martin
 Landeck Castle, Klingenmünster
 Lindelbrunn Castle, Vorderweidenthal
 Villa Ludwigshöhe, Edenkoben
 Madenburg Castle, Eschbach
 Meistersel Castle, Ramberg
 Muenz Castle, Leinsweiler
 Neukastel Castle, Leinsweiler
 Neuscharfeneck Castle, Flemlingen
 Ramburg Castle, Ramberg
 Reichsburg Trifels, Annweiler (Imperial Regalia, Legend of Blondel)
 Scharfenberg Castle, Leinsweiler
 Rietburg Castle, Rhodt
 Schloss Sankt Johann, Albersweiler
 Waldschlössel, Klingenmünster
 Wasserschloss, Pleisweiler-Oberhofen

Landkreis Südwestpfalz 

 Altdahn Castle, Dahn
 Berwartstein Castle, Erlenbach (Hans von Trotha ("Hans Trapp"))
 Blumenstein Castle (Palatinate), Schönau
 Burghalder Castle, Hauenstein
 Burgschnabel Castle, Hilst
 Drachenfels Castle, Busenberg (Franz von Sickingen)
 Entenstein Castle, Rodalben
 Falkenburg Castle, Wilgartswiesen
 Grafendahn Castle, Dahn
 Gräfenstein Castle, Merzalben
 Bundenbach Castle, Großbundenbach
 Heidelsburg Castle, Clausen
 Klein-Frankreich Castle, Erlenbach
 Lemberg Castle, Lemberg
 Lindelskopf Castle, Fischbach bei Dahn
 Lustschloss Monbijou, Dietrichingen
 Neudahn Castle, Dahn
 Ruppertstein Castle, Lemberg (Palatinate)
 Steinenschloss Castle, Thaleischweiler-Fröschen
 Tanstein Castle, Dahn
 Wegelnburg Castle, Schönau (Palatinate)
 Wiesbach Castle, Wiesbach (Palatinate)
 Wilgartaburg Castle, Wilgartswiesen

Landkreis Trier-Saarburg 
 Old Castle (Longuich), Longuich
 Heid Castle, Lampaden
 Osburg Castle
 Ramstein Castle, Kordel (Eifel)
 Kollesleuken Castle, Freudenburg
 Sommerau Castle, Sommerau
 Welschbillig Castle, Welschbillig
 Wincheringen Castle
 Grimburg, Grimburg
 Maximiner Castle, Fell
 Saarburg, Saarburg
 Schloss derer von Kesselstatt, Föhren
 Schloss Ayl
 Schloss Föhren, Prümer Hof
 Schloss Grünhaus, Mertesdorf
 Schloss Marienlay, Morscheid
 Schloss Saarfels, Serrig
 Schloss Thorn, Palzem
 Schloss Warsberg, Saarburg
 Wasserburg Klüsserath

Landkreis Vulkaneifel 
 Bertradaburg, Mürlenbach
 Freudenkoppe Castle, Neroth
 Gerolstein Castle, Gerolstein
 Kasselburg, Pelm
 Kerpen Castle, Kerpen
 Lissingen Castle, Gerolstein

Westerwaldkreis 
 Grenzau Castle, Höhr-Grenzhausen
 Schloss Hachenburg, Hachenburg
 Hartenfels Castle, Hartenfels
 Schloss Montabaur, Montabaur
 Sporkenburg, Eitelborn
 Steinebach Castle, Steinebach
 Westerburg Castle (WW), Westerburg

Zweibrücken 

 Zweibrücken Castle

More than one county 
 Siegfried Line

See also
 List of castles
 List of castles in Germany

Sources 
 Landesamt für Denkmalpflege: Staatliche Burgen, Schlösser und Altertümer in Rhineland Pfalz. Schnell und Steiner, Mainz, 2003, 
 Krahe, Friedrich-Wilhelm: Burgen des Deutschen Mittelalters. Bechtermünz Verlag, Augsburg, 1996 
 Reisezeit Zeitreise - zu den schönsten Schlössern, Burgen, Gärten, Klöstern und Römerbauten in Deutschland. Verlag Schnell & Steiner GmbH, Regensburg, 1999
 Die deutschen Burgen und Schlösser. S. Fischer Verlag GmbH, Frankfurt am Main, 1987,

External links 
 Burgen, Schlösser, Altertümer Rhineland-Pfalz
 Burgendatenbank für die Region Trier